Natchez is the only city in and the county seat of Adams County, Mississippi, United States. It has a total population of 14,520 (as of the 2020 census). Located on the Mississippi River across from Vidalia in Concordia Parish, Louisiana,  Natchez was a prominent city in the antebellum years, a center of cotton planters and Mississippi River trade.

Natchez is the 25th-largest city in the state. The city was named for the Natchez tribe of Native Americans, who with their ancestors, inhabited much of the area from the 8th century AD through the French colonial period.

History 

Established by French colonists in 1716, Natchez is one of the oldest and most important European settlements in the lower Mississippi River Valley. After the French lost the French and Indian War (Seven Years' War), they ceded Natchez and near territory to Great Britain in the Treaty of Paris of 1763. (It later traded other territory east of the Mississippi River with Great Britain, which expanded what it called West Florida). The British Crown bestowed land grants in this territory to officers who had served with distinction in the war. These officers came mostly from the colonies of New York, New Jersey, and Pennsylvania. They established plantations and brought their upper-class style of living to the area.

Beginning 1779, the area was under Spanish colonial rule. After defeat in the American Revolutionary War, Great Britain ceded the territory to the United States under the terms of the Treaty of Paris (1783). Spain was not a party to the treaty, and it was their forces who had taken Natchez from British troops. Although Spain had been allied with the American colonists, they were more interested in advancing their power at the expense of Britain. Once the war was over, they were not inclined to give up that which they had acquired by force.

In 1797 Major Andrew Ellicott of the United States marched to the highest ridge in the young town of Natchez, set up camp, and raised the first American Flag claiming Natchez and all former Spanish lands east of the Mississippi above the 31st parallel for the United States.

After the United States acquired this area from the Spanish, the city served as the capital of the Mississippi Territory and then of the state of Mississippi. It predates Jackson by more than a century; the latter replaced Natchez as the capital in 1822, as it was more centrally located in the developing state. The strategic location of Natchez, on a bluff overlooking the Mississippi River, ensured that it would be a pivotal center of trade, commerce, and the interchange of ethnic Native American, European, and African cultures in the region; it held this position for two centuries after its founding.

In U.S. history, Natchez is recognized particularly for its role in the development of the Old Southwest during the first half of the 19th century. It was the southern terminus of the historic Natchez Trace, with the northern terminus being Nashville, Tennessee. After unloading their cargoes in Natchez or New Orleans, many pilots and crew of flatboats and keelboats traveled by the Trace overland to their homes in the Ohio River Valley. (Given the strong current of the Mississippi River, it was not until steam-powered vessels were developed in the 1820s that travel northward on the river could be accomplished by large boats.) The Natchez Trace also played an important role during the War of 1812. Today the modern Natchez Trace Parkway, which commemorates this route, still has its southern terminus in Natchez.

In the decades preceding the Civil War, Natchez was by far the most prevalent slave trading city in Mississippi, and second in the United States only to New Orleans. The leading markets were located at the Forks of the Road, at the intersection of Liberty Road and Washington Road (now D’Evereux Drive and St. Catherine Street). In 1833, the most active slavers in the United States, John Armfield and Isaac Franklin began a program of arbitraging low slave prices in the Middle Atlantic area by sending thousands of slaves to Deep South markets in Natchez and New Orleans. Their company, Franklin and Armfield sent an annual caravan of slaves, called a coffle, from Virginia to the Forks of the Road in Natchez, as well as sending others by ship through New Orleans. Unlike other slave sellers of the day, Franklin and Armfield sold slaves individually, with the buyers allowed to survey the people much like items in a modern retail store.

In 1840, the city was struck by a devastating tornado that killed 317 people and injured 109. It ranks today as the second-deadliest tornado in U.S history, although the death toll may be higher due to slave deaths not traditionally being counted in the South at that time.

In the middle of the nineteenth century, the city attracted wealthy Southern planters as residents, who built mansions to fit their ambitions. Their plantations were vast tracts of land in the surrounding lowlands along the river fronts of Mississippi and Louisiana, where they grew large commodity crops of cotton and sugarcane using slave labor. Natchez became the principal port from which these crops were exported, both upriver to Northern cities and downriver to New Orleans, where much of the cargo was exported to Europe. Many of the mansions built by planters before 1860 survive and form a major part of the city's architecture and identity. Agriculture remained the primary economic base for the region until well into the twentieth century.

During the American Civil War Natchez was surrendered by Confederate forces without a fight in September 1862. Following the Union victory at the Battle of Vicksburg in July 1863, many refugees, including former slaves, freed by the Emancipation Proclamation, began moving into Natchez and the surrounding countryside. The Union Army officers claimed to be short on resources and unable to provide for the refugees. The Army planned to address the situation with a mixture of paid labor for freed slaves on government leased plantations, the enlistment of able bodied males who were willing to fight in the Union Army and the establishment of refugee camps where former slaves could be provided with education. However, as the war continued, the plan was never effectively implemented and the leased plantations were crowded, poorly managed and frequently raided by Confederate troops who controlled the surrounding territory. Hundreds of people living in Natchez, including many former slaves and refugees, died of hunger, disease, overwork or were killed in the fighting during this period. In order to manage the tens of thousands of freed Black slaves, the Union Army created a concentration camp in Natchez in a natural pit known as the Devil's Punchbowl, where thousands died of starvation, smallpox, and other diseases. 

After the American Civil War, the city's economy rapidly revived, mostly due to Natchez having been spared the destruction visited upon many other parts of the South. From 1870 to 1871, Robert H. Wood served as Mayor of Natchez, he was the one of only five African Americans to served as mayor during the Reconstruction-era, and he may be the first black mayor in the entire country. Natchez was also home to politians Hiram Rhodes Revels and John R. Lynch, both African Americans.

The vitality of the city and region was captured most significantly in the 80 years or so following the war by the photographers Henry C. Norman and his son Earl. The output of the Norman Studio between roughly 1870 and 1950 documents this period in Natchez's development vividly; the photographs are now preserved as the Thomas and Joan Gandy Collection in special collections of the library of Louisiana State University in Baton Rouge. 

During the twentieth century, the city's economy experienced a downturn, first due to the replacement of steamboat traffic on the Mississippi River by railroads in the early 1900s, some of which bypassed the river cities and drew away their commerce. Later in the 20th century, many local industries closed in a restructuring that sharply reduced the number of jobs in the area. Despite its status as a popular destination for heritage tourism because of well-preserved antebellum architecture, Natchez has had a general decline in population since 1960. It remains the principal city of the Natchez micropolitan area.

Geography

Climate
Natchez has a humid subtropical climate (Cfa) under the Köppen climate classification system.

Demographics
According to the 2020 United States census, there were 14,520 people, 6,026 households, and 3,149 families residing in the city. According to the census of 2000, there were 18,464 people, 7,591 households, and 4,858 families residing in the city.

Race and ethnicity

In 2000, the racial and ethnic makeup of the city was 54.49% African American, 44.18% White, 0.38% Asian, 0.11% Native American, 0.02% Pacific Islander, 0.18% from other races, and 0.63% from two or more races. 0.70% of the population were Hispanic or Latino of any race. Since then, with the publication of the 2020 census, its racial and ethnic makeup was 60.12% African American, 35.51% non-Hispanic white, 0.11% Native American, 0.5% Asian, 0.01% Pacific Islander, 2.36% other or mixed, and 1.38% Hispanic or Latino of any race.

Economy
Adams County Correctional Center, a private prison operated by the Corrections Corporation of America on behalf of the Federal Bureau of Prisons, is in an unincorporated area in Adams County, near Natchez.

Education
Natchez is home to Alcorn State University's Natchez Campus, which offers the School of Nursing, the School of Business, and graduate business programs. The School of Business offers Master of Business Administration (MBA) degree and other business classes from its Natchez campus. The MBA program attracts students from a wide range of academic disciplines and preparation from the Southwest Mississippi area and beyond offering concentrations in general business, gaming management and hospitality management. Both schools in the Natchez campus provide skills which has enabled community students to have an important impact on the economic opportunities of people in Southwest Mississippi.

Copiah-Lincoln Community College also operates a campus in Natchez.

The city of Natchez and Adams County operate one public school system, the Natchez-Adams School District. The district comprises ten schools. They are Susie B. West, Morgantown, Gilmer McLaurin, Joseph F. Frazier, Robert Lewis Magnet School, Natchez Freshman Academy, Natchez Early College@Co-Lin, Central Alternative School, Natchez High School, and Fallin Career and Technology Center.

In Natchez, there are a number of private and parochial schools. 
Adams County Christian School (ACCS) is also a PK-12 school in the city. Adams County Christian School was founded as a segregation academy and is a member of the Mississippi Association of Independent Schools (MAIS). Cathedral School is also a PK-12 school in the city. It is affiliated with the Roman Catholic St. Mary Basilica. Holy Family Catholic School, founded in 1890, is a PK-3 school affiliated with Holy Family Catholic Church.

Media
A list of media in the Natchez metropolitan area (collectively known as the "Miss-Lou"):

AM

FM

Infrastructure

Transportation

Highways 
U.S. 61 runs north–south, parallel to the Mississippi River, linking Natchez with Port Gibson, Woodville, Mississippi and Baton Rouge, Louisiana.

U.S. 84 runs east–west and bridges the Mississippi, connecting it with Vidalia, Louisiana and Brookhaven, Mississippi.

U.S. 425 runs north from Natchez after crossing the Mississippi, connecting Ferriday with Clayton, at which point U.S. 65 follows the west bank of the Mississippi, connecting to Waterproof north to St. Joseph, Newellton, and Tallulah, Louisiana.

U.S. 98 runs east from Natchez towards Bude and McComb, Mississippi.

Mississippi 555 runs north from the center of Natchez to where it joins Mississippi Highway 554.

Mississippi 554 runs from the north side of the city to where it joins Highway 61, northeast of town.

Rail 
Natchez is served by the Natchez Railway, which interchanges with Canadian National.

Air 
Natchez is served by the Natchez-Adams County Airport, a general aviation facility. The nearest airports with commercial service are Baton Rouge Metropolitan Airport,  to the south via US 61 and Alexandria International Airport,  to the west via US 84 to LA-28W.

Notable people

 Robert H. Adams, former United States senator from Mississippi
 William Wirt Adams, Confederate States Army officer, grew up in Natchez
 Philip Alston, prominent plantation owner and early American outlaw
 Glen Ballard, five-time Grammy Award-winning songwriter/producer
 Pierre A. Barker, former Mayor of Buffalo, New York
 Campbell Brown, Emmy Award-winning journalist, political anchor for CNN; grew up in Natchez and attended both Trinity Episcopal and Cathedral High School
 John J. Chanche, first Roman Catholic bishop of Natchez, buried on the grounds of St. Mary Basilica, Natchez
 George Henry Clinton, member of both houses of the Louisiana State Legislature in the first quarter of the 20th century, born in Natchez in the late 1860s
 Charles C. Cordill, Louisiana state senator from Concordia and Tensas parishes, interred at Natchez City Cemetery
 Charles G. Dahlgren, Confederate brigadier general during American Civil War
 Olu Dara, musician and father of rapper Nas
 Varina Howell Davis, first lady of the Confederate States of America; born, reared, and married in Natchez
 Bob Dearing, longtime member of the Mississippi State Senate
 Ellen Douglas, novelist, author of Black Cloud, White Cloud and Apostles of Light, nominated for the National Book Award
 A. W. Dumas (1876-1945), physician
 Stephen Duncan (1787-1867), planter and banker
 Robert C. Farrell (born 1936), journalist and member of the Los Angeles City Council, 1974–91
 Je'Kel Foster, basketball player
 Terry W. Gee, member of the Louisiana House of Representatives from 1980 to 1992 from suburban New Orleans; born in Natchez in 1940, died in Baton Rouge in 2014
Jimmie Giles, NFL Tight End & four-time Pro Bowl selection in the 1980s while with the Tampa Bay Buccaneers
 Mickey Gilley, country music singer, born in Natchez
 Hugh Green, All-American defensive end at the University of Pittsburgh, two-time Pro Bowler, Heisman runner-up
 Elizabeth Taylor Greenfield, noted black concert singer and Mississippi Musicians Hall of Fame inductee, was born in Natchez in 1824.
 Cedric Griffin, Minnesota Vikings cornerback born in Natchez but raised in San Antonio, Texas
 Bishop Gunn, rock and roll band whose members were born in Natchez and hold 'The Bishop Gunn Crawfish Boil' in the city every May.
 Malcolm Harvey, former sheriff of Stone Mountain, Georgia and murderer, was born in Natchez
 Abijah Hunt, merchant during the Territorial Period who owned a chain of stores and public cotton gins along the Natchez Trace
 Von Hutchins, former NFL football player for the Indianapolis Colts 2004-2005 Houston Texans 2006-2007Atlanta Falcons 2008
 Greg Iles, raised in Natchez and a best-selling author of many novels set in the city
 Wharlest Jackson, Sr. (1929–1967), civil rights activist
 Rosa Vertner Jeffrey (1828-1894), poet and novelist
 William Johnson, "The Barber of Natchez", freed slave and prominent businessman
 Nook Logan, former Major League Baseball player for the Washington Nationals
 John R. Lynch, the first African-American Speaker of the House in Mississippi and one of the earliest African-American members of Congress
 Samuel Abraham Marx, architect, was born in Natchez
 George Mathews, former governor of Georgia, lived in Natchez in the late 1790s.
 Lynda Lee Mead, Miss Mississippi in 1959 and Miss America in 1960. A Natchez city street, Lynda Lee Drive, is named in her honor.
 Marion Montgomery, jazz singer born in Natchez
 Anne Moody, civil rights activist and author of Coming of Age in Mississippi, attended Natchez Junior College
 Alexander O'Neal, R&B singer
 John Anthony Quitman, Mexican War hero, plantation owner, governor of Mississippi, owner of Monmouth Plantation
 Clyde V. Ratcliff, member of the Louisiana State Senate from 1944 to 1948, lived in Natchez
 Rico Richardson, NFL player
 Stevan Ridley, NFL running back for the Denver Broncos
 Pierre Adolphe Rost, a member of the Mississippi State Senate and commissioner to Europe for the Confederate States, immigrated to Natchez from France
 Billy Shaw, Pro Football Hall of Fame member, born in Natchez
 Chris Shivers, two-time PBR world champion bull rider, born in Natchez
 Carter Smith, film director and fashion photographer
 Abdul Rahman Ibrahima Sori, African nobleman sold into slavery and sent to work a plantation in Natchez, Mississippi for thirty-eight years before being freed at the request of Abd al-Rahman, the Sultan of Morocco
 Hound Dog Taylor, blues singer and slide guitar player
 Fred Toliver, former pitcher for the Philadelphia Phillies and the Minnesota Twins
 Don José Vidal, Spanish governor of the Natchez District, buried in the Natchez City Cemetery
 Joanna Fox Waddill, Civil War nurse known as the "Florence Nightingale of the Confederacy"
 Samuel Washington Weis (1870–1956), painter
 Marie Selika Williams, first black artist to perform at the White House
 Richard Wright, novelist, author of Black Boy and Native Son, born on Rucker plantation in Roxie, twenty-two miles east of Natchez; lived in Natchez as a child
 Robert H. Wood (1844–?), politician, first African American mayor in the United States, former mayor of Natchez

In popular culture
Various movies have been shot here, including The Autobiography of Miss Jane Pittman (1974), Crossroads (1986), Raintree County (1957), Horse Soldiers (1959), Rascals and Robbers: The Secret Adventures of Tom Sawyer and Huckleberry Finn (1981), 
The Ladykillers (2004), Get On Up (2014) and Ma (film) (2019).

Historic sites

Post-classical thru Early modern periods
 Anna site
 Grand Village of the Natchez

Antebellum period

 Commercial Bank and Banker's House
 First Presbyterian Church of Natchez
 Great Natchez Tornado
 Natchez Museum of African American History and Culture
 Natchez National Cemetery
 Natchez On-Top-of-the-Hill Historic District
 Selma Plantation
 St. Mary Basilica, Natchez
 United States Courthouse (Natchez, Mississippi)

Pre-Civil War homes

 Airlie (Natchez)
 Arlington (Natchez, Mississippi)
 Auburn (Natchez, Mississippi)
 Brandon Hall (Washington, Mississippi)
 The Briars (Natchez, Mississippi)
 The Burn (Natchez, Mississippi)
 Concord (Natchez, Mississippi)
 Cottage Gardens
 D'Evereux
 Dunleith
 Elgin (Natchez, Mississippi)
 The Elms (Natchez, Mississippi)
 Elms Court
 Glenfield Plantation
 Gloucester (Natchez, Mississippi)
 Hawthorne Place
 Homewood Plantation (Natchez, Mississippi)
 Lansdowne (Natchez, Mississippi)
 Linden (Natchez, Mississippi)
 Longwood (Natchez, Mississippi)
 Magnolia Hill (Natchez, Mississippi)
 Melrose (Natchez, Mississippi)
 Monmouth (Natchez, Mississippi)
 Montaigne (Natchez, Mississippi)
 Ravenna (Natchez, Mississippi)
 Richmond (Natchez, Mississippi)
 Routhland

Town houses

Choctaw
 Green Leaves
 House on Ellicott's Hill
 King's Tavern
 The Presbyterian Manse
 Magnolia Hall (Natchez, Mississippi)
 Rosalie Mansion
 Smith-Bontura-Evans House
 Stanton Hall
 William Johnson House (Natchez, Mississippi)
 Winchester House (Natchez, Mississippi)

Footnotes

Further reading

 Anderson, Aaron D. Builders of a New South: Merchants, Capital, and the Remaking of Natchez, 1865-1914. Jackson, MS: University Press of Mississippi, 2013.
 Boler, Jaime Elizabeth. City under Siege: Resistance and Power in Natchez, Mississippi, 1719–1857, PhD. U. of Southern Mississippi, Dissertation Abstracts International 2006 67(3): 1061-A. DA3209667, 393p.
 Brazy, Martha Jane. An American Planter: Stephen Duncan of Antebellum Natchez and New York, Louisiana State U. Press, 2006. 232 pp.
 Broussard, Joyce L. "Occupied Natchez, Elite Women, and the Feminization of the Civil War," Journal of Mississippi History, 2008 70(2): 179–207.
 Broussard, Joyce L. Stepping Lively in Place: The Not-Married, Free Women of Civil War-Era Natchez, Mississippi. Athens, GA: University of Georgia Press, 2016.
 Cox, James L. The Mississippi Almanac. New York: Computer Search & Research, 2001. .
 Davis, Jack E. Race Against Time: Culture and Separation in Natchez Since 1930, Baton Rouge: Louisiana State University Press, 2001.
 Davis, Ronald L. F. Good and Faithful Labor: from Slavery to Sharecropping in the Natchez District 1860-1890, Westport, CT: Greenwood Press, 1982.
 Dittmer, John. Local People: The Civil Rights Movement in Mississippi. Urbana: University of Illinois Press, 1994.
 Dolensky, Suzanne T. "Natchez in 1920: On the Threshold of Modernity." Journal of Mississippi History 72#2 (2011): 95-137 online 
 Gandy, Thomas H. and Evelyn. The Mississippi Steamboat Era in Historic Photographs: Natchez to New Orleans, 1870–1920. New York: Dover Publications, 1987.
 Gower, Herschel. Charles Dahlgren of Natchez: The Civil War and Dynastic Decline Brassey's, 2002. 293 pp.
 Inglis, G. Douglas. "Searching for Free People of Color in Colonial Natchez," Southern Quarterly 2006 43(2): 97–112
 James, Dorris Clayton. Ante-Bellum Natchez (1968), the standard scholarly study
 Libby, David J. Slavery and Frontier Mississippi, 1720–1835, U. Press of Mississippi, 2004. 163 pp. focus on Natchez
 Nguyen, Julia Huston. "Useful and Ornamental: Female Education in Antebellum Natchez," Journal of Mississippi History 2005 67(4): 291–309
 Nolan, Charles E. St. Mary's of Natchez: The History of a Southern Catholic Congregation, 1716–1988 (2 vol 1992)
 Umoja, Akinyele Omowale. "'We Will Shoot Back': The Natchez Model and Paramilitary Organization in the Mississippi Freedom Movement"], Journal of Black Studies, Vol. 32, No. 3 (Jan., 2002), pp. 271–294. In JSTOR
 Way, Frederick. Way's Packet Dictionary, 1848–1994: Passenger Steamboats of the Mississippi River System Since the Advent of Photography in Mid-Continent America. 2nd ed. Athens, OH: Ohio University Press, 1994.
 Wayne, Michael. The Reshaping of Plantation Society: The Natchez District, 1860–1880 (1983).

External links

 City of Natchez official website

 
Populated places established in 1716
Cities in Adams County, Mississippi
Cities in Mississippi
Cities in Natchez micropolitan area
Mississippi populated places on the Mississippi River
Mississippi
County seats in Mississippi
French-American culture in Mississippi
Natchez Trace
Mississippi placenames of Native American origin